Vladyslav Viktorovych Vashchuk (born on 2 January 1975) is a retired Ukrainian football defender who last played for FC Volyn Lutsk.

Vashchuk was also a member of the Ukraine national football team playing 63 times. He mainly played in the centre back position and could also be utilized as a sweeper.

Career

Club career
Vashchuk began his playing days in the Dynamo Kyiv football academy.  He made his senior team debut in 1993, and went on to play for them for the next 10 seasons. In 2003, he spent a single season playing in Russia with Spartak Moscow, moving back to Ukraine with FC Chornomorets Odessa for the following, 2004/05 season. After playing 6 games in the 2005/06 season he moved back to Dynamo Kyiv. With Dynamo he won a total of 9 Ukrainian Premier League titles, 6 Ukrainian Cup, and 1 Ukrainian Super Cup. In the summer of 2008 he signed a 1-year deal with newly promoted FC Lviv which only lasted for 6 months. On 11 March 2009 he signed a contract for the remainder of the season with FC Chornomorets Odessa. At the end of the 2008/09 season his contract ran out and he was released as a free agent. Vashchuk then rejoined Chornomorets for the 2009–10 season, but left again at season end.

International career
Vashchuk began his International career with the Ukraine Under-21 team, making 22 appearances for them. Since 1996 he has played for the senior team. In 2006, he was chosen to play in Ukraine's first ever World Cup finals tournament. Vashchuk received a red card in his first game at the tournament from Swiss referee Massimo Busacca in a controversial decision. A penalty kick was awarded to Spain in the 47th minute because of the alleged infraction, despite multiple camera angles which indicated no physical contact between the players in the penalty area.

Career statistics

Club

International goals

Honours
 Ukrainian Premier League: 1993–94, 1994–95, 1995–96, 1996–97, 1997–98, 1998–99, 1999–00, 2000–2001, 2006–07
 Ukrainian Cup: 1996, 1998, 1999, 2000, 2006, 2007
 Ukrainian Super Cup: 2006

References

External links
Profile on Dynamo Kyiv official website
Profile on website Football Ukraine
Full season stats on Odessa Football website
Profile on Football Squads

Living people
1975 births
Footballers from Kyiv
Ukrainian footballers
Ukraine international footballers
Ukraine under-21 international footballers
FC Dynamo Kyiv players
FC Chornomorets Odesa players
FC Spartak Moscow players
Russian Premier League players
FC Lviv players
FC Volyn Lutsk players
2006 FIFA World Cup players
Ukrainian Premier League players
Ukrainian expatriate footballers
Expatriate footballers in Russia
Ukrainian expatriate sportspeople in Russia
Association football defenders